The Frederick and Sallie Lyons House, at 801 Live Oak St. in Pleasanton, Texas, was listed on the National Register of Historic Places in 2001.

It is a modified L-plan building constructed between 1912 and 1913.

References

		
National Register of Historic Places in Atascosa County, Texas